Ramasagara  is a village in the southern state of Karnataka, India. It is located in the Hospet taluk of Bellary district in Karnataka.

Demographics
 India census, Ramasagara had a population of 6172 with 3151 males and 3021 females.

See also
 Bellary
 Districts of Karnataka
This village is situated near Hampi about 12 km & also near to Kampli about 6 km.

References

External links
 http://Bellary.nic.in/

Villages in Bellary district